Horacio Carochi (1586–1666) was a Jesuit priest and grammarian who was born in Florence and died in New Spain. He is known for his grammar of the Classical Nahuatl language.

Life
Carochi was born in Florence. He went to Rome where he entered the Society of Jesus. From Rome he went to the New World, arriving in New Spain (now Mexico). There he dedicated himself to the study of the indigenous languages and became proficient in Otomi and then in Nahuatl. He was a friend of the Bishop and later Viceroy of New Spain, Juan de Palafox y Mendoza, as is documented by surviving letters written by Carochi to the bishop.

Importance
Carochi had an acute understanding of the Nahuatl language and was the first grammarian to understand and propose a consistent transcription of two difficult phenomena in Nahuatl phonology, namely vowel length and the saltillo. His Arte or grammar was seen as important soon after its publication, and as early as 1759 a version edited by Ignacio Paredes was issued. This version, however, lacks most of the virtues of the original work.

His original Arte de la lengua Mexicana is considered by linguists today to be the finest and most useful of the extant early grammars of Nahuatl. He also wrote a grammar of Otomi, which is now lost.

Works

Of the works of Carochi, only the Arte de la lengua Mexicana has been printed; the others exist only in manuscript form.

Arte de la Lengua mexicana con la declaración de todos sus adverbios, printed in Mexico in 1645
Vocabulario copioso de la Lengua mexicana
Gramática de la Lengua Otomí
Vocabulario Otomí
Sermones en Lengua mexicana

References
 
 
 

1586 births
1666 deaths
17th-century linguists
Clergy from Florence
Italian expatriates in the Spanish Empire
Italian Roman Catholic missionaries
Linguists from Italy
17th-century Italian Jesuits
Nahuatl-language writers
Translators from Nahuatl
Linguists of Mesoamerican languages
Italian Mesoamericanists
17th-century Mesoamericanists
Jesuit missionaries
Roman Catholic missionaries in New Spain
Missionary linguists
Linguists of Uto-Aztecan languages
Classical Nahuatl
17th-century Italian translators